Stanley Hawkins (24 November 1924 – 11 July 2004) was a British water polo player. He competed in the men's tournament at the 1952 Summer Olympics.

References

1924 births
2004 deaths
British male water polo players
Olympic water polo players of Great Britain
Water polo players at the 1952 Summer Olympics